Collingwood & Co., formerly Collingwood O'Hare, is a British TV animation studio based in London headed by writer/director Tony Collingwood. They are known for animated TV series like Oscar's Orchestra, Dennis the Menace, Gordon the Garden Gnome, Yoko! Jakamoko! Toto!, The Secret Show and The Cat in the Hat Knows a Lot About That!, among others.

List of television series
RARG (1988)
Captain Zed and the Zee Zone (1991)
Oscar's Orchestra (1995–1996)
Dennis and Gnasher (1996–1998)
Pond Life (1996–2000)
Animal Stories (1999–2002)
Busy Buses (1999–2003)
The Magic Key  (2000–2001)
Eddy and the Bear (2001–2002)
The King's Beard (2002)
Yoko! Jakamoko! Toto! (2003–2005)
Harry and His Bucket Full of Dinosaurs (2005–2008)
Gordon the Garden Gnome (2005–2007)
The Secret Show (2006–2007)
The Cat in the Hat Knows a Lot About That! (2010–2018)
The Cat in the Hat Knows a Lot About Christmas! (2012)
Ruff-Ruff, Tweet and Dave (2015–2019)
Parpazoids (2015)
Hero Elementary (2020–present)

TV special
Daisy-Head Mayzie (1995)

DTV
Thumbelina (1992)

References

External links
 

Television production companies of the United Kingdom
British companies established in 1988
Mass media companies established in 1988
British animation studios
1988 establishments in the United Kingdom